Woodberry station is a Baltimore Light Rail station in the Woodberry neighborhood of Baltimore, Maryland, United States. The station has two side platforms serving two tracks.

The station is near the former site of the Woodberry station of the Northern Central Railway, an affiliate of the Pennsylvania Railroad.

References

External links

Station from Union Avenue from Google Maps Street View

Baltimore Light Rail stations
Railway stations in Baltimore
Woodberry, Baltimore